Michael A. Sowers (also known as Michael A. Sauers, 14 September 1844 – 7 January 1920) was a private in the United States Army who was awarded the Medal of Honor for gallantry in the American Civil War. Sowers was awarded the medal on 16 February 1897 for actions performed at the Battle of Stony Creek Depot in Virginia in 1864.

Personal life 
Sowers was born in Pittsburgh, Pennsylvania on 14 September 1844. He died on 7 January 1920 in Findley, Pennsylvania, and is buried in Saint Columbkille Cemetery in Imperial, Pennsylvania.

Military service 
Sowers enlisted in the Army as a private on 4 March 1864 in Pittsburgh. He was assigned to Company L of the 41st Pennsylvania Cavalry. On 1 December 1864, during the Battle of Stony Creek Depot, Sowers had his horse shot out from under him but continued with his charge on foot, eventually being one of the first Union soldiers to enter the Confederate fortifications at Stony Creek.

Sowers later recounted the experience, saying:

This action won Sowers the Medal of Honor. His medal citation reads:

Sowers was mustered out of the Army on 1 July 1865 at Lynchburg, Virginia.

References 

United States Army Medal of Honor recipients
American Civil War recipients of the Medal of Honor
Military personnel from Pittsburgh
1844 births
1920 deaths